Keiji Oyama (小山 桂司, born November 19, 1980) is a Japanese former professional baseball catcher in Japan's Nippon Professional Baseball. He played for the Hokkaido Nippon-Ham Fighters in 2008, the Chunichi Dragons from 2009 to 2011, and for the Tohoku Rakuten Golden Eagles from 2012 to 2015.

External links

NBP

1980 births
Living people
Baseball people from Sendai
Japanese baseball players
Nippon Professional Baseball catchers
Chunichi Dragons players
Hokkaido Nippon-Ham Fighters players
Tohoku Rakuten Golden Eagles players